Eugenia Maniokova and Leila Meskhi were the defending champions and won in the final 6–2, 6–2 against Åsa Carlsson and Caroline Schneider.

Seeds
Champion seeds are indicated in bold text while text in italics indicates the round in which those seeds were eliminated.

 Eugenia Maniokova /  Leila Meskhi (champions)
 Sabine Appelmans /  Claudia Porwik (withdrew)
 Isabelle Demongeot /  Christina Singer (quarterfinals)
 Radka Bobková /  Petra Langrová (semifinals)

Draw

External links
 1994 EA-Generali Ladies Linz Doubles Draw

1994 WTA Tour